The Topper is an 11 foot  sailing dinghy designed by Ian Proctor. The Topper was a one-design boat until 2023 when a new version was produced, and is sailed mostly around the British Isles. It was recognised as a World Sailing Class. The boat previously constructed from polypropylene, and now roto moulded, is popular as a racing boat or for sail training. The class association (itca) organise racing events, which range from small travellers to major championships. The RYA run squads alongside the events; in these squads young sailors who are given specialist race coaching.

Class history and design
The Topper was designed by Ian Proctor in 1977 as a One-Design racing boat. The Topper has been in continuous production for over four decades and over 50,000 examples have now been sold. The Topper dinghy is built in the UK by Topper International Ltd. owned by Martin Fry who purchased the company from Guinness Leisure in 1983. In 1977 the boat won the Design Council Award and the Horner Award for achievements in plastics.

The Topper dinghy is widely used for racing, but it has also gained popularity as a boat in which to learn how to sail. The Topper was originally designed with a glass reinforced plastic (GRP) hull making it a relatively light but durable boat, however, it was later decided that the Topper should be constructed with injection moulding, using polypropylene, which is less expensive but heavier and less rigid.

Although the Topper was originally rigged with an aft mainsheet, since 2004 the option to use a centre main has been allowed. The motivation for such a change being that most other dinghies, including the ones Topper sailors are likely to advance to, are rigged with centre mainsheets.

In 2005 a smaller 4.2 m² sail was approved, which can optionally be used in favour of the standard 5.3 m² sail. The smaller sail is more efficient than a larger sail that is reefed. The first 4.2m² national championships were held in 2010.

In 2018, development began of a new 6.8m rig for the Topper 

At 11' the Topper is named for the ability to transport it on the roof of a car, and the mast splits into two sections, allowing the spars to be stored and transported.

Despite the age of the design, the Topper Class remains one of the fastest growing classes in the UK, with a very active national association. The Topper class is a recognised World Sailing International Class since 2005. The GBR Nationals and the World Championships often have over 200 boats.

The largest fleet is in Great Britain where the class is part of the RYA "pathway" class program with turnouts at the RYA Zone Championships and the highest percentage of RYA Transitional Youth Squad members. Most 'GB Young Sailor of the Year' nominations in recent years have come from within the Topper Class.

Event

World Championships

See also

 Dinghy sailing
 Dinghy racing
 Farr 3.7

References

External links

 International Topper Class Association
 World Sailing Topper Microsite
 Irish Topper Class Association
 Great Britain Topper Class Association
 Topper Sailboats Canada
 Story of development of the polypropylene version of the Topper

Dinghies
Boats designed by Ian Proctor
1970s sailboat type designs
Classes of World Sailing